Pere Comte (also spelled Pere Compte; died 1506) was a Spanish architect from Girona. He was one of the main Gothic architects of the Aragonese court of the period, and in particular in Valencia, where he directed the construction of numerous palaces. Pere Compte is considered a master of the Valencian Gothic art.

Comte's works include the Convent of St. Dominic (1454–1457), together with Francesc Baldomar, the restoration of the Torres de Quart (1468), a chapel in the church of Sant Nicolau (1476), the crossing of the Cathedral of Orihuela and the Llotja de la Seda (1483–1498).

He also directed or created the works of other important buildings as the Cathedral of Valencia from 1479, the Tortosa Cathedral, from 1490. He will be employed by the house of Borgia in the Monastery of Sant Jeroni de Cotalba, near Gandia (Valencia) where he will realize the sculptures of the upper cloister and a gothic stair. and in the Collegiate Basilica of Gandia.

References

Sources

External links 

15th-century births
1506 deaths
People from Girona
Architects from Catalonia
Gothic architects
15th-century Spanish architects
Monastery of Sant Jeroni de Cotalba